Levski may refer to:

Places 
Levski, Pleven Province, a town in Bulgaria
, a village in Suvorovo Municipality, Bulgaria
Levski, Pazardzhik Province, a village in Panagyurishte Municipality, Bulgaria
Levski Peak (Bulgaria), in the Balkan Mountains, in central Bulgaria
Levski Peak (Antarctica), a mountain on Livingston Island, Antarctica
Levski Ridge, a mountain ridge on Livingston Island, Antarctica
Vasil Levski Boulevard, a road in Sofia, Bulgaria

Other uses 
Vasil Levski, a revolutionary and national hero of Bulgaria
Levski Sofia, a Bulgarian football club
Levski Sofia (sports club), a Bulgarian sports club
Levski Volley, a Bulgarian volleyball team
BC Levski Sofia, a Bulgarian basketball team

See also 
 Vasil Levski (disambiguation)